The Quintet/Live! is a live album led by saxophonist Charles McPherson recorded in 1966 at the Five Spot Café and released on the Prestige label. The album was released as an expanded CD with bonus tracks in 1995 as Live at the Five Spot.

Reception

AllMusic awarded the album 4 stars with its review by Scott Yanow stating, "McPherson is a commanding performer, with a penetrating tone and an ability to explore a song for subtler possibilities".

Track listing 
 "The Viper" (Charles McPherson) – 4:22  
 "I Can't Get Started" (Vernon Duke, Ira Gershwin) – 9:10  
 "Shaw 'Nuff" (Ray Brown, Gil Fuller, Dizzy Gillespie) – 10:24  
 "Here's That Rainy Day" (Johnny Burke, Jimmy Van Heusen) – 6:35  
 "Never Let Me Go" (Ray Evans, Jay Livingston) – 11:35  
 "Suddenly" (McPherson) – 6:50  
 "I Believe in You" (Frank Loesser) – 8:13 Bonus track on CD reissue   
 "Epistrophy" (Kenny Clarke, Thelonious Monk) – 7:28 Bonus track on CD reissue   
 "Luminescence" (Barry Harris) – 10:41 Bonus track on CD reissue

Personnel 
Charles McPherson – alto saxophone
Lonnie Hillyer – trumpet
Barry Harris – piano
Raymond McKinney – bass
Billy Higgins – drums

References 

Charles McPherson (musician) live albums
1967 live albums
Prestige Records live albums
Albums produced by Don Schlitten
Albums recorded at the Five Spot Café